Anke Huber was the defending champion but did not compete that year.

Judith Wiesner won in the final 7–6, 6–3 against Ruxandra Dragomir.

Seeds
A champion seed is indicated in bold text while text in italics indicates the round in which that seed was eliminated.

  Judith Wiesner (champion)
 n/a
  Silvia Farina (quarterfinals)
  Sandra Cecchini (quarterfinals)
  Ruxandra Dragomir (final)
  Virginia Ruano-Pascual (second round)
  Veronika Martinek (first round)
  Andrea Temesvári (first round)
  Jana Kandarr (first round)

Draw

External links
 1995 Styrian Open Draw

WTA Austrian Open
1995 WTA Tour